De'Aaron Martez Fox (born December 20, 1997) is an American professional basketball player for the Sacramento Kings of the National Basketball Association (NBA). He played college basketball for the Kentucky Wildcats before being selected 5th overall by the Kings in the 2017 NBA draft. He was selected to his first All-Star team as a reserve in 2023.

High school career

Fox attended Cypress Lakes High School in Katy, Texas. As a junior, he averaged 23.8 points, 6.1 rebounds, and 3.5 assists per game. During the summer, Fox d Houston Hoops on the Nike Elite Youth Basketball League Circuit (EYBL) where he earned EYBL first-team honors. On November 29, Fox scored 31 points, 12 rebounds, and 6 assists in a 68–53 victory over MacArthur. On December 28, Fox put up 31 points and 6 assists in a 91–81 victory against Jay M. Robinson High School. As a senior, Fox averaged 32.1 points, 7.6 rebounds, and 4.1 assists per game. In January 2016, Fox was named a McDonald's All-American and played in the 2016 McDonald's All-American Game on March 30. In April, Fox played in the 2016 Jordan Brand Classic, leading the East team to a 131–117 win while earning Co-MVP honors alongside Kentucky teammate Malik Monk. Fox then competed at the Nike Hoop Summit Games. He made the 2015–16 USA Men's Basketball Men's Junior Team in September 2015. He was also invited to the NBPA Top 100 camp. Throughout his high school career, Fox led Cypress Lakes to three state playoff appearances including a regional final appearance his senior year, and twice scored 50 points in a single game.

Recruiting
Fox was the nation's second best point guard behind Lonzo Ball. He was rated as a five-star ranked and ranked the consensus No. 6 overall recruit in the Class of 2016 by the four main recruiting services: Rivals, ESPN, and 247Sports.

He committed to Kentucky on November 12, 2015, live on ESPNU. He chose Kentucky over Kansas, Louisville, and LSU.

College career
On November 13, 2016, Fox recorded 21 points and 3 assists during a 93–69 victory over Canisius College at the Bluegrass Showcase. Six days later, he posted 16 points and 6 assists to defeat Duquesne University, 93–69. In a game against Arizona State on November 28, he recorded a triple double with 14 points, 11 rebounds, and 10 assists; this made Fox only the second Wildcat in the history of Kentucky basketball to record one after Chris Mill in 1988. On January 7, 2017, Fox scored 27 points to go along with 6 assists in a 97–71 victory over Arkansas. He tallied 21 points and 5 assists to defeat Mississippi State, 88–81, on January 17. On February 18 that year, Fox scored 16 points and dished out 5 assists to help the Wildcats defeat the Georgia Bulldogs. On March 4, Fox scored 19 points in a 71–63 win over Texas A&M. Kentucky would go on to defeat Georgia in the quarterfinals and Alabama in the semi-finals. On March 12, Fox scored 18 points in an 82–65 win over Arkansas in the SEC tournament in addition earning SEC Tournament MVP honors. On March 17, Fox scored 19 points and 3 assists to defeat Northern Kentucky University in the first round of the NCAA tournament. On March 19, Fox scored 14 points to defeat Wichita State 65–62 in the second round of the NCAA Tournament. On March 24, In a Sweet 16 matchup against the UCLA Bruins, Fox scored 39 points to advance the Kentucky Wildcats to the Elite Eight game. On March 26, Fox only scored 13 points in a 75–73 loss to the North Carolina Tar Heels.

At the conclusion of his freshman season, Fox announced that he would forgo his final three years of collegiate eligibility and enter the 2017 NBA draft.

Professional career

Sacramento Kings (2017–present)

Early years (2017–2019) 
On June 22, 2017, Fox was selected with the fifth overall pick in the 2017 NBA draft by the Sacramento Kings. On July 8, 2017, he signed his rookie scale contract with the Kings. During four games of the 2017 NBA Summer League, Fox averaged 11.8 points, 3 assists and 2.3 steals while playing 21.3 minutes per game. Fox made his NBA debut for the Kings in their season opener on October 18, 2017, against the Houston Rockets, where he scored 14 points, 4 rebounds, and 5 assist in 24-plus minutes in a 105–100 loss. On October 23, 2017, Fox recorded a career-high 19 points, 4 assist, 5 rebounds, and 3 steals in a 117–115 loss against the Phoenix Suns. On December 8, 2017, he scored 14 points, 4 assist and 2 steals in a 116–109 win against the New Orleans Pelicans. On January 6, 2018, Fox recorded 18 points and 7 assist in a 106–98 victory over the Denver Nuggets. On January 25, 2018, Fox scored 14 points, 4 assist and a putback slam dunk with 3.3 seconds left giving the Sacramento Kings the lead in an 89–88 win over the Miami Heat. On January 28, 2018, Fox scored a season-high 26 points, going 6–6 from three-point range in a 15-point loss to the San Antonio Spurs. On February 14, Fox was named Lonzo Ball's replacement for the Rising Stars Challenge.

On November 1, 2018, during a 146–115 win over the Atlanta Hawks, Fox notched his first career triple-double with 31 points, 10 rebounds, and 15 assists to bring the Kings to a 6–3 record, becoming the only player after LeBron James in 2005 to score a 30-point triple double before the age of 21. Fox drastically improved during the 2018–2019 season. Not only did he improve in every major statistical category (Including his points per game from 11.6 to 17.3 and assists per game from 4.4 to 7.3), He also finished top 3 and was nominated for the NBA Most Improved Player Award, finishing second to Pascal Siakam.

Franchise player and first All-Star selection (2019–present) 
On July 31, 2020, Fox scored a then career-high 39 points in a 129–120 loss to the San Antonio Spurs. This was the Kings’ first game in the Orlando bubble, returning from a 4-month hiatus due to the COVID-19 pandemic.

On November 25, 2020, Fox signed a contract extension with the Kings. On February 8, 2021, Fox was named Western Conference Player of the Week for the first time in his career averaging 31 points & nearly 9 assists while winning all 4 games on the first week of February. On March 26, 2021, Fox scored a career-high 44 points on 16-of-22 from the field in a 141–119 victory over the Golden State Warriors. On March 29, 2021, Fox was once again named Player of the Week for the second time during Week 14. Fox averaged nearly 37 points & 5 assists per game while shooting 64% from the field over the 4 games, all ending in victories for the Kings.

On March 5, 2022, Fox tied his career-high with 44 points on 18-for-31 shooting in a 114–113 loss against the Dallas Mavericks. On March 12, Fox had 41 points and a season-high 11 assists in a 134–125 loss against the Utah Jazz.

On November 5, 2022, Fox put up 37 points, alongside a buzzer-beating, game-winning three, in a 126–123 overtime win over the Orlando Magic. He was named the Western Conference Player of the Week for November 14–20 after leading Sacramento to a 3–0 record, where he averaged 25 points, 3.7 rebounds and 8 assists per game. On December 28, Fox recorded 31 points and a season-high 13 assists in a 127–126 win over the Denver Nuggets. On February 10, 2023, he was named an All-Star for the first time in his career as a reserve. Fox and Anthony Edwards were announced as injury replacements for injured stars Stephen Curry and Zion Williamson. On February 24, Fox recorded a season-high 42 points, 12 assists, five rebounds and five steals in a 176–175 double overtime win over the Los Angeles Clippers. It was the second-highest scoring game in NBA history. On March 15, Fox put up a game-winning three-pointer in a 117–114 win over the Chicago Bulls.

Career statistics

NBA

Regular season

|-
| style="text-align:left;"|
| style="text-align:left;"|Sacramento
| 73 || 60 || 27.8 || .412 || .307 || .726 || 2.8 || 4.4 || 1.0 || .3 || 11.6
|-
| style="text-align:left;"|
| style="text-align:left;"|Sacramento
| 81 || 81 || 31.4 || .458 || .371 || .727 || 3.8 || 7.3 || 1.6 || .6 || 17.3
|-
| style="text-align:left;"|
| style="text-align:left;"|Sacramento
| 51 || 49 || 32.0 || .480 || .292 || .705 || 3.8 || 6.8 || 1.5 || .5 || 21.1
|-
| style="text-align:left;"|
| style="text-align:left;"|Sacramento
| 58 || 58 || 35.1 || .477 || .322 || .719 || 3.5 || 7.2 || 1.5 || .5 || 25.2
|-
| style="text-align:left;"|
| style="text-align:left;"|Sacramento
| 59 || 59 || 35.3 || .473 || .297 || .750 || 3.9 || 5.6 || 1.2 || .4 || 23.2
|- class="sortbottom"
| style="text-align:center;" colspan="2"|Career
| 322 || 307 || 32.1 || .462 || .320 || .725 || 3.5 || 6.2 || 1.3 || .4 || 19.1
|- class="sortbottom"
| style="text-align:center;" colspan="2"|All-Star
| 1 || 0 || 9.3 || .000 || – || – || .0 || 2.0 || .0 || .0 || .0

College

|-
| style="text-align:left;"|2016–17
| style="text-align:left;"|Kentucky
| 36 || 34 || 29.6 || .479 || .246 || .736 || 4.0 || 4.6 || 1.5 || .2 || 16.7

Player profile
He is left-handed.

Coming out of Kentucky, Fox was highly regarded among scouts for his quickness, speed, and athleticism. These attributes combined make Fox one of the most dangerous players on the fast break and driving to the rim. Fox is often considered to be the fastest player in the NBA. Fox himself stated in 2018 "If we’re talking about from baseline to baseline with the ball in my hands, I’m definitely the fastest person in the league."

Fox is a high end finisher at the rim, being able to use his body control and leaping ability to finish layups and draw fouls and often using his speed and quickness to blow by defenders. Fox is considered to be a poor 3-point shooter, as during the 2019–2020 NBA season, Fox shot a career low 29.2% shooting percentage from three.

Fox has also demonstrated good passing ability, averaging around seven assists per game. Fox generates most of his assists running the pick and roll and the fast break.

On defense, Fox can be exploited by bigger guards because of his small frame, but can intercept passes and makes quick rotations due to his elite quickness and nearly 6-foot 7 inch wingspan.

Personal life
Fox was born to his parents Aaron and Lorainne Harris-Fox and has one brother named Quentin Fox. Fox goes by the nicknames “Fox”, “Swipa”, and “Swipa da Fox”. Fox chose the number zero at Kentucky because he “fears no one”, giving his original number five to teammate Malik Monk. According to his high school coach, Fox would come to school at 6 AM and practice in the gym every morning. Fox would sleep on the couch almost every night and play the NBA 2K video game series. This, according to his father, is one of the reasons he has developed into the player that he is today.

Fox signed a multi-year endorsement deal with Nike prior to the 2017 NBA draft.

Fox is also a fan of the Dragon Ball Z anime series and says that Vegeta is his favorite character. In 2017, Fox sported Dragon Ball Z inspired Nike shoes in game.

In February 2022, Fox was the subject of criticism after he shut down his personal NFT project “SwipaTheFox”, with more than $1.5 million in unpaid investment to approximately 100,000 investors. Fox explained his decision in a Twitter thread, wherein he claimed he wasn't satisfied with the quality of the project so far and was shutting it down until the end of the NBA season, but did not answer critics who demanded a return of their investment.

In August 2022, Fox married Recee Caldwell at an elaborate ceremony in Malibu, California. Fox and Caldwell gave birth to their son Reign Fox on February 3rd, 2023.

References

External links

 Kentucky Wildcats bio
 USA Basketball bio

1997 births
Living people
African-American basketball players
American men's basketball players
Basketball players from Texas
Kentucky Wildcats men's basketball players
McDonald's High School All-Americans
People from Cypress, Texas
Point guards
Sacramento Kings draft picks
Sacramento Kings players
Sportspeople from Harris County, Texas
21st-century African-American sportspeople